Aspartyl aminopeptidase is an enzyme. This enzyme catalyses the following chemical reaction

 Release of an N-terminal aspartate or glutamate from a peptide, with a preference for aspartate

Aminoacyl-arylamides are poor substrates.

References

External links 
 

EC 3.4.11